St. Peter's Episcopal Church is a parish of the Episcopal Church in Ripon, Wisconsin, in the Diocese of Fond du Lac.
The parish also operates a chapel of ease, St Mary's, in Wautoma.

The parish church was added to the National Register of Historic Places for its architectural significance in 1974.

References

External links

Churches on the National Register of Historic Places in Wisconsin
Episcopal churches in Wisconsin
Churches in Fond du Lac County, Wisconsin
Carpenter Gothic church buildings in Wisconsin
Churches completed in 1860
19th-century Episcopal church buildings
Ripon, Wisconsin
National Register of Historic Places in Fond du Lac County, Wisconsin